Back for Love is the fifth studio album by Dutch-English pop group Caught in the Act. It was released by H'Art Records on 23 November 2016 in German-speaking Europe. The band's first release in 18 years, it marked their first album without original band member Benjamin Boyce. Produced by Christian Geller, Back for Love contains a mixture of updated classics and new songs. It debuted and peaked at number 81 on the German Albums Chart.

Track listing
All tracks produced by Christian Geller.

Charts

Release history

References

2016 albums
Caught in the Act albums